White Plains is a census-designated place and unincorporated community in Calhoun County, Alabama, United States. Its population was 877 as of the 2020 census. The community is located in eastern Calhoun County along Alabama Highway 9.

Demographics

Education
The Calhoun County Schools system operates three schools within the community:
White Plains High School
White Plains Middle School
White Plains Elementary School

White Plains High School's athletic teams are known as the Wildcats and compete in Class 4A of the Alabama High School Athletic Association.

References

Census-designated places in Calhoun County, Alabama
Census-designated places in Alabama